Pope Donus (died on 11 April 678) was the bishop of Rome from 676 to his death. Few details survive about him or his achievements beyond what is recorded in the Liber Pontificalis.

Election
Donus was the son of a Roman named Maurice. He became pope on 2 November 676, having been selected to succeed Adeodatus II. By that time, Donus was already elderly.

Pontificate
Donus expanded the clergy of Rome with twelve new priests and five deacons. He also consecrated six bishops for various sees.  One of these may have been Vitalianus of Arezzo. He had the atrium of Old St. Peter's Basilica paved with large blocks of white marble, and restored other churches of Rome, notably the church of St. Euphemia on the Appian Way and the Basilica of St. Paul Outside the Walls. Donus was shocked to discover a colony of Nestorian monks in Boetianum, a Syrian monastery in Rome. He gave their monastery to Roman monks and dispersed them through the various religious houses of the city in the hope that they would accept Chalcedonian Christianity. The Nestorians were possibly refugees fleeing the Muslim conquest of the Levant. 

During the pontificate of Donus, Archbishop Reparatus of Ravenna returned to the obedience of the Holy See, thus ending the schism created by Archbishop Maurus, who had aimed at making Ravenna autocephalous. Donus' relations with Constantinople tended towards the conciliatory.  On 10 August 678, Emperor Constantine IV addressed him as "the most holy and blessed archbishop of our ancient Rome and the universal pope," hoping to attract him to engage in negotiations with the patriarch of Constantinople and the Monothelites.<ref>Delogu, p. 61 note 14:  Dono sanctissimo ac beatissimo archiepiscopo antiquae nostrae Romae et universali papae...."  </ref>  He ordered that Pope Vitalianus' name be put back in the diptychs of those bishops in communion with Constantinople, an act which caused him a great deal of trouble from the Monothelites and Patriarch Theodore I of Constantinople.

Donus died on 11 April 678  and was buried the same day in Old St. Peter's Basilica. He was succeeded by Agatho.

References

Sources

Doglu, Paolo. "Il papato tra l'impero bizantino e l'Occidente nel VII e VIII secolo," in:  
Duchesne, Louis (ed.) (1886). Le Liber pontificalis; texte, introduction et commentaire par L. Duchesne  Tome premier.  Paris: E. Thorin.  pp. 348–349.
Mann, Horace Kinder (1903).  The Lives of the Popes in the Early Middle Ages.  Volume I, Part II. London: Kegan Paul.  pp. 20–22.

External links
Gasparri, Stefano (2000).  "Dono".  Enciclopedia dei Papi  Retrieved: 2016-11-27.
Pope Donus in Patron Saints Index''

678 deaths
Popes
Italian popes
Popes of the Byzantine Papacy
7th-century archbishops
Year of birth unknown
7th-century popes
610 births
Burials at St. Peter's Basilica